The men's lightweight coxless four competition at the 2010 Asian Games in Guangzhou, China was held from 14 November to 18 November at the International Rowing Centre.

Schedule 
All times are China Standard Time (UTC+08:00)

Results

Heat 
 Qualification: 1–6 → Final (FA)

Final

References 

Results

External links 
Official Website

Rowing at the 2010 Asian Games